"Young Guns" is the debut single by British record producer Lewi White, featuring vocals from Ed Sheeran, Yasmin, Griminal, and Devlin. It was released on 8 July 2011 as a digital download in the United Kingdom.

Music video 
A music video to accompany the release of "Young Guns" was first released onto YouTube on 10 June 2011. The video was directed by Carly Cussen.

The music video stars Sheeran, Yasmin, Griminal and Devlin in a laboratory being tested on with White as a scientist. The theme of the video is based on the four elements. Sheeran being fire, Yasmin being air/wind, Griminal being earth and Devlin being water.

Track listing

Chart performance

Release history

References

2011 singles
2011 songs
Ed Sheeran songs
Yasmin (musician) songs
Devlin (rapper) songs
Songs written by Jake Gosling
Songs written by Ed Sheeran